The British Film Institute Act 1949 (1949 c. 35) is an Act of the Parliament of the United Kingdom. It allows the government to fund the British Film Institute.

Provisions
The Act has only one operative section which allowed the Treasury to make grants to the British Film Institute out of Parliament-approved funds. This was in addition to any grants from the Cinematograph Fund established under the Sunday Entertainments Act 1932.

Amendments
The Act was amended by the Sunday Cinema Act 1972 to remove the reference to the Cinematograph Fund, as it was being wound up.

Timetable
The Act had its second reading in the House of Commons on 6 May 1949. It was passed to the House of Lords on 16 May, and had its second reading there on 25 May. The Act was given royal assent on 31 May 1949.

See also

List of Acts of the Parliament of the United Kingdom, 1940–1959

References

United Kingdom Acts of Parliament 1949
British Film Institute
1949 in British cinema
1949 in British law